Yuri Lvovich Ovchinnikov (born 3 June 1950 in Leningrad) is a Russian figure skating coach and former competitor for the Soviet Union. He is the 1975 European bronze medalist, 1976 Prize of Moscow News champion, and 1975 Soviet national champion. He represented the Soviet Union at the 1972 Winter Olympics, where he placed 12th, and at the 1976 Winter Olympics, where he placed 8th.

As a coach, he led Igor Bobrin to the 1981 European title and 1981 World bronze medal. He is a coach and choreographer for Team del Sol, a synchronized skating team in San Diego, California. He has two children.

Results

References

Navigation

Russian male single skaters
Soviet male single skaters
Olympic figure skaters of the Soviet Union
Figure skaters at the 1972 Winter Olympics
Figure skaters at the 1976 Winter Olympics
1950 births
Living people
Russian emigrants to the United States
Figure skaters from Saint Petersburg
European Figure Skating Championships medalists
Soviet figure skating coaches